Bo Bo Oo (born Feb 3, 1965) is a Myanmar politician. He is a member of National League for Democracy. He was elected as a member of Lower House(State Assembly) in 2015 election. Bo Bo Oo was jailed by the former military junta from 1989 to 2009.

He was elected as a Yangon divisional parliament member on November 8, 2020, election, represent Dala Township, Yangon Region.

References 

National League for Democracy politicians
Members of Pyithu Hluttaw
University of Yangon alumni
Living people
1965 births